Luperca is a genus of ground beetles in the family Carabidae. There are at least two described species in Luperca.

Species
These two species belong to the genus Luperca:
 Luperca goryi (Guérin-Méneville, 1838)  (Africa)
 Luperca laevigata (Fabricius, 1781)  (Bangladesh, India, and Pakistan)

References

Siagoninae